Patou Simbi Ebunga (born 26 March 1983) is a retired Congolese football defender.

References

International goals 

1983 births
Living people
Democratic Republic of the Congo footballers
Democratic Republic of the Congo international footballers
AS Vita Club players
Al-Hilal Club (Omdurman) players
FC Renaissance du Congo players
AS Dauphins Noirs players
Linafoot players
Girabola players
Association football defenders
Democratic Republic of the Congo expatriate footballers
Expatriate footballers in Sudan
Democratic Republic of the Congo expatriate sportspeople in Sudan
Expatriate footballers in the Republic of the Congo
Democratic Republic of the Congo expatriate sportspeople in the Republic of the Congo
Expatriate footballers in Angola
Democratic Republic of the Congo expatriate sportspeople in Angola
2011 African Nations Championship players
Democratic Republic of the Congo A' international footballers
Sportspeople from Kinshasa
2022 African Nations Championship players